The Cryptix General License is in use by the Cryptix project, well known for their Java Cryptography Extension. It is a modified version of the BSD license, with similarly liberal terms. The Free Software Foundation states that it  is a permissive free software license compatible with the GNU General Public License.

References

External links
 Cryptix General License
 Cryptix.org
 BSD License Template

Free and open-source software licenses
Permissive software licenses